Viktor Tsaryov (1939 – 2020) was a Soviet sprint canoeist who competed in the early 1970s. He won two gold medals in the K-1 10000 m events at the ICF Canoe Sprint World Championships, earning them in 1970 and 1971.

References

Profile at Sport-strana.ru 

1939 births
2020 deaths
Soviet male canoeists
Russian male canoeists
Sportspeople from Yaroslavl
ICF Canoe Sprint World Championships medalists in kayak